Mimbres may refer to:
 Mimbres culture (c. 1100–1150 CE), a subdivision of Mogollon culture
 Mimbres pottery, a particular style of pottery decoration from the Mimbres culture
 Mimbres Valley AVA, an American Viticultural Area in southwestern New Mexico
 Mimbres River, a river in New Mexico
 Mimbres Mountains, the southernmost part of the Black Range
 Mlimbres Apaches, a band of the Chiricahua Apaches of the Southwestern US.